Supreme National Council was the central civil government of Poland loyal to the Kościuszko Insurrection. Created by Kościuszko on 10 May 1794 in Połaniec camp, it had 8 councillors and 32 deputies.

See also

 Provisional Temporary Council

Government of Poland
Political history of Poland
Kościuszko Uprising
1794 establishments in the Polish–Lithuanian Commonwealth